= Yakov Gercberg =

Polish political activist (1898–1937)

Yakov Lvovich Gercberg (Polish: Jakow Lwowicz Gercberg; Russian: Яков Львович Герцберг; 10 January 1898 in Warsaw – 26 October 1937 in Moscow) was a Polish political activist, Soviet officer of the secret services.

Gercberg was a member of the Polish Socialist Party (PPS). In 1919, he joined the Russian Communist Party (Bolsheviks). He served in the Red Army, fighting on the Western Front against Poland where he was wounded. In 1923, he joined the OGPU. He worked as an engineer at a Black Sea oil company. On 24 August 1937, he was arrested by the NKVD. After the trial during the Great Purge, he was sentenced to death on 26 October 1937 and executed.
